is a Japanese former football player and manager. He played for the Japan national team from 1995 to 1998.

Club career
Omura was born in Matsue, Japan on September 6, 1969. After graduating from Juntendo University, he joined Yokohama Marinos (later Yokohama F. Marinos) in 1992. In the 1990s, he played center-back with Japan national team player Masami Ihara. The club won the champions 1992 Emperor's Cup. In Asia, the club won the 1992–93 Asian Cup Winners' Cup and in 1995 the J1 League. In 2000s, the club won second place at the 2000 J1 League and the champions at the 2001 J.League Cup. He moved to Vegalta Sendai in 2002 and Sanfrecce Hiroshima in 2004. In 2006, his opportunity to play decreased and he moved to J2 League club Yokohama FC in August 2006. In 2008, he moved to Japan Football League club Gainare Tottori. He retired end of 2008 season.

International career
On May 21, 1995, Omura debuted for the Japan national team against Scotland. In 1996, he became a regular player and played center-back with club teammate Masami Ihara. He also played each of Japan's matches at the 1996 Asian Cup. In 1997, although he played at 1998 World Cup qualification, his opportunity to play decreased. In 1998, he played for Japan at the 1998 World Cup. He played in one game against Jamaica instead of Eisuke Nakanishi for suspension. This match was his last game for Japan. He played 30 games and scored four goals for Japan until 1998.

Coaching career
In 2013, Omura became a manager for Gainare Tottori. However the club performed poorly that year. He was sacked in August 2013, when Gainare was in 20th place of 22 clubs.

Career statistics

Club

International

Scores and results list Japan's goal tally first, score column indicates score after each Omura goal.

Managerial statistics

References

External links
 
 
 Japan National Football Team Database
 
 

1969 births
Living people
Juntendo University alumni
Association football people from Shimane Prefecture
Japanese footballers
Japan international footballers
J1 League players
J2 League players
Japan Football League players
Yokohama F. Marinos players
Vegalta Sendai players
Sanfrecce Hiroshima players
Yokohama FC players
Gainare Tottori players
1996 AFC Asian Cup players
1998 FIFA World Cup players
Japanese football managers
J2 League managers
Gainare Tottori managers
Association football defenders